Tony Bradley may refer to:

Tony Bradley (basketball) (born 1998), American basketball player
Tony Bevilacqua (born 1976), Tony Bradley while with The Distillers

See also
Anthony Bradley, American author and professor of religion
Anthony W. Bradley, British lawyer